Didier Paass (born 24 June 1982) is a Togolese former professional footballer  who played as a midfielder.

Club career 
Paass was born in Lomé. He played with French clubs Red Star Saint-Ouen and Olympique Noisy-le-Sec, German TSV Aindling, Bosnian NK Posušje and Aris Limassol in Cyprus. During the season 2009–10 he played with French Championnat National side Amiens SC. In summer 2010 he joined Jura Sud Lavans. In seasons 2012 and 2013 he played at the Réunion Premier League side SS Saint-Louisienne, who became league winners in 2012.

International career 
Paass has made eight appearances for the Togo national team.

References 

1982 births
Living people
Togolese footballers
Togo international footballers
Association football forwards
Red Star F.C. players
Olympique Noisy-le-Sec players
HŠK Posušje players
Aris Limassol FC players
Amiens SC players
Jura Sud Foot players
SS Saint-Louisienne players
Togolese expatriate footballers
Togolese expatriate sportspeople in France
Expatriate footballers in France
Togolese expatriate sportspeople in Germany
Expatriate footballers in Germany
Expatriate footballers in Bosnia and Herzegovina
Togolese expatriate sportspeople in Cyprus
Expatriate footballers in Cyprus
21st-century Togolese people